Untere Argen is a river of Baden-Württemberg and Bavaria, Germany. Its source is near the village Börlas in southwestern Bavaria. It passes along Isny im Allgäu and Wangen im Allgäu. At its confluence with the Obere Argen near Neukirch, the Argen is formed.

See also
List of rivers of Baden-Württemberg
List of rivers of Bavaria

References

Rivers of Baden-Württemberg
Rivers of Bavaria
Rivers of Germany